Sulcerato rehderi is a species of small sea snail, a marine gastropod mollusk in the family Eratoidae, the false cowries or trivias.

This is a taxon inquirendum.

Description
The shell grows to a length of 1.6 mm.

Distribution
This species occurs in the Pacific Ocean off Easter Island.

Notes
 Raines. 2002. Contribution to the knowledge of Easter Island Mollusca. Conchiglia 34 (304): 11–40
 Raines, B.K. (2007) New molluscan records from Easter Island, with the description of a new Ethminolia. Visaya, 2(1), 70–88. page(s): 81
 Fehse D. (2020). Contributions to the knowledge of the Eratoidae. XVIII. A new Sulcerato Finlay 1930 from the Australes. Neptunea. 15(2): 7-10. page(s): 9; note: stated to be probably a synonym of S. galapagensis

References

Eratoidae
Gastropods described in 2002
Molluscs of the Pacific Ocean